List of ethnic groups in Southwest Papua, Indonesia:

List

See also
Indigenous people of New Guinea
Ethnic groups in Indonesia
Southwest Papua
List of districts of Southwest Papua
Southwest Papuan languages

References

Ethnic groups in Indonesia
Southwest Papua
Southwest Papua
Southwest Papua